Dietikon railway station is a railway station in Switzerland, situated in the canton of Zürich and the city of Dietikon (Limmat Valley). The station is located on the Swiss Federal Railway's Zürich to Olten main line and is also the terminus of the metre gauge Bremgarten–Dietikon railway (BD).

Dietikon station is not to be confused with Dietlikon railway station located in Dietlikon in the Glatt Valley (canton of Zürich).

History 
The first station on the site was built by the Swiss Northern Railway in 1847, as part of their pioneering line from Zürich to Baden, and hence was one of the first railway stations in Switzerland. The original station building was constructed on the northern side of the railway line and still exists, albeit now used as a rail enthusiasts' club.

The original station was replaced in the 1860s by a new building on the southern, city centre, side of the line. This in turn was replaced in the 1970s by the current large station building on the same side of the line.

Operation 
The station has five through platforms on the main line, two terminal platforms on the Bremgarten–Dietikon railway (S17) and, since 2022, two terminal platforms on the Limmattal light rail line (Limmattalbahn), which is operated by AVA.

Whilst the Bremgarten–Dietikon  terminal platforms are alongside their main line equivalents, trains approach them via street running track through the centre of Dietikon and across the station frontage.

Service 
Dietikon station is served by Zürich S-Bahn lines S11, S12, S19, and S42; by some long-distance trains on the main line; and by S-Bahn line S17 on the BD.

For most of the day, S-Bahn line S11 provides 2 train per hour (tph) to Zürich and Winterthur and 1 tph to Lenzburg and Aarau. Line S12 provides 2 tph to Zürich and Winterthur and 2 tph to Baden and Brugg. Line S17 provides 2 tph to Wohlen, with an additional 2 tph as far as Bremgarten on weekdays only. During most of the day, Dietikon is the western terminus of the S19 service. The line provides 2 tph Effretikon via Zürich HB. Some peak hour S19 services extended from Effretikon to Pfäffikon ZH and from Dietikon to Koblenz.

Additionally there is a single InterRegio (IR) train per hour between Zurich Airport and Basel SBB that calls at Dietikon in both directions.

On weekends, there is also a nighttime S-Bahn services (SN1) offered by ZVV.

Summary of rail services:

 : Between Zurich Airport and Basel SBB, via .
 Zürich S-Bahn:
 : half-hourly service to  via .
 Nighttime S-Bahn (only during weekends):

Gallery

References

External links 

 

Railway stations in Switzerland opened in 1847
Railway stations in the canton of Zürich
Swiss Federal Railways stations
Dietikon